Angst, självdestruktivitetens emissarie is the third album by Shining. It was released on Avantgarde Music, in 2002. An LP edition was released, limited to 500 copies.

Track listing

Personnel
 Niklas Kvarforth – vocals, guitar
 Insis – guitar
 Phil A. Cirone – bass guitar, keyboard
 Hellhammer – drums

Shining (Swedish band) albums
Avantgarde Music albums
2002 albums